Eslövs AI BTK is a table tennis club based in Eslöv, Sweden. They have won the Swedish championship 13 times and also reached the final of the European Champions League – the premier continental competition in Europe – in 2015/2016.

The club has also got athletics and wrestling sections.

Eslöv won the Swedish championship with a record margin in 2008.

Honors
Pingisligan:
Winners: 2005, 2006, 2007, 2008, 2009, 2011, 2012, 2013, 2014, 2015, 2016, 2017, 2019
Runners-up: 1998, 2010, 2018
European Champions League:
Runners-up: 2016

Team

Roster
Roster for the 2016–17 season
 Xu Hui
 Daniel Kosiba
 Robert Svensson
 Truls Möregårdh

References

External links

Table tennis clubs in Sweden
Sports clubs established in 1908
1908 establishments in Sweden